The second season of the television series Live Rescue began airing September 23, 2019, on A&E in the United States. Matt Iseman took over from Ashleigh Banfield as the new host for season 2.

Episodes

References

2019 American television seasons